Jan Cockx (1891, Boechout – 26 August 1976) was a Belgian painter perhaps best known for landscapes, still life and harbor scenes.

Working with exuberant colors and mostly large-scale canvases, Cockx often painted simple subjects in vibrant ways. He defined space with color and often flattened the perspective.  Some of his paintings appear to be influenced by Post-Impressionist and Fauve artists including Matisse and Gauguin. The pure, strong colors and distortion of form evocative of Fauvism are seen in a number of Cockx's works.

World War I interrupted his studies at the Antwerp Royal Academy of Fine Arts and set back his fledgling art career.  His first show, in Paris, was not until 1920, but was quickly followed by exhibitions in Antwerp (1922), Geneva (1923) and at museums in Maastricht and Lyon.

His artistic career included experimentation with ceramics, graphics and illustrations for Ça ira, an art magazine group.

References

External links
 Negen Houtsneden by Jan Cockx Exhibitions, acquisitions, and other highlights from the Graphic Arts Collection, Princeton University Library.
 Hommage aan Jan Cockx
 Boechout: Receptie met Jan Cockx  Video: Art reception with Jan Cockx.
 Boechout: Jan Cockx aan het werk in zijn atelier Video: At work in his studio.

1891 births
1976 deaths
People from Boechout
Belgian artists
Royal Academy of Fine Arts (Antwerp) alumni
20th-century Belgian painters